Panzerina is a genus of plants in the Lamiaceae first described in 1982. It contains 2 known species, native to Siberia, China, and Mongolia.

Species
 Panzerina canescens (Bunge) Soják - Mongolia, Xinjiang, Altai Republic
 Panzerina lanata (L.) Soják - Mongolia, Xinjiang, Gansu, Nei Mongol, Ningxia, Shaanxi, Altai Republic, Chita, Tuva, Buryatiya, Irkutsk

References

Lamiaceae
Lamiaceae genera